XHBX-FM is a radio station on 105.9 FM in Sabinas, Coahuila. It is owned by GRD Multimedia and is known as La Primera with a grupera format.

History
XEBX-AM 610 received its concession on August 21, 1946. It operated with 5,000 watts day and 500 watts night. These power levels remained until the AM-FM migration.

It was authorized to move to FM in 2011.

References

Radio stations in Coahuila